The women's 1500 m competition in speed skating  at the 2022 Winter Olympics was held on 7 February, at the National Speed Skating Oval ("Ice Ribbon") in Beijing. Ireen Wüst of the Netherlands won the distance. She set a new Olympic record and won her sixth Olympic gold medal, thereby becoming the first person to win individual gold medals at five different Olympics. Miho Takagi of Japan won silver, and Antoinette de Jong of the Netherlands bronze.

The defending champion was Wüst, who was also the 2010 champion, the 2014 silver medalist, and the 2018 champion. The world record holder, Takagi, was also competing. The bronze medalist, Marrit Leenstra, retired from competitions. Ragne Wiklund was the 2021 World Single Distances champion at the 1500 m  distance. Brittany Bowe and Evgeniia Lalenkova were the silver and bronze medalist, respectively. Ayano Sato was leading the 2021–22 ISU Speed Skating World Cup at the 1500 m distance with four races completed before the Olympics, followed by Bowe and Takagi. Takagi skated the season best time, 1:49.99 in Salt Lake City on 5 December 2021.

Qualification

A total of 30 entry quotas were available for the event, with a maximum of three athletes per NOC. The first 20 athletes qualified through their performance at the 2021–22 ISU Speed Skating World Cup, while the last ten earned quotas by having the best times among athletes not already qualified. A country could only earn the maximum three spots through the World Cup rankings.

The qualification time for the event (1:59.50) was released on July 1, 2021, and was unchanged from 2018. Skaters had the time period of July 1, 2021 – January 16, 2022 to achieve qualification times at valid International Skating Union (ISU) events.

Records
Prior to this competition, the existing world, Olympic and track records were as follows.

A new Olympic record was set in the competition.

Results
The races were started at 16:30.

References

Women's speed skating at the 2022 Winter Olympics